Mielenko may refer to the following places in Poland:

Mielenko, Kuyavian-Pomeranian Voivodeship
Mielenko, West Pomeranian Voivodeship
Mielenko Drawskie
Mielenko Gryfińskie
Mielenko-Kolonia